Chester Gillan (born 25 September 1943) is a former Canadian educator and politician from Prince Edward Island.

Born in Charlottetown and educated at Saint Dunstan's University and the University of New Brunswick, Gillan was a high school teacher before entering politics, being elected from 1996 to 2007 as a candidate for the Prince Edward Island Progressive Conservative Party in the electoral district of Parkdale-Belvedere (now Charlottetown-Sherwood) in the Legislative Assembly of Prince Edward Island.

He served as the Minister of Health in the cabinet of then-Premier Pat Binns.

References 

1943 births
Living people
Members of the Executive Council of Prince Edward Island
People from Charlottetown
Progressive Conservative Party of Prince Edward Island MLAs
Saint Dunstan's University alumni
University of New Brunswick alumni
21st-century Canadian politicians